The 1982 Missouri Valley Conference men's basketball tournament was played after the conclusion of the 1981–1982 regular season. The quarterfinal and semifinal rounds were played on campus sites with the final contested at the Tulsa Convention Center in Tulsa, Oklahoma.

The tenth ranked Tulsa Golden Hurricane defeated the Illinois State Redbirds in the championship game, 90-77, and as a result won their first MVC Tournament title to earn an automatic bid to the 1982 NCAA tournament.

Bracket

Note: * indicates host institution

References

1981–82 Missouri Valley Conference men's basketball season
Missouri Valley Conference men's basketball tournament
Missouri Valley Conference men's basketball tournament